Jiukouzi is a township of Xingtang County in the eastern foothills of the Taihang Mountains in western Hebei province, China, located about  northwest of the county seat. , it has 36 villages under its administration. The township is situated on the northern shore of the Koutou Reservoir.

See also
List of township-level divisions of Hebei

References

Township-level divisions of Hebei